The Kaohsiung Film Archive (KFA) is a movie center in Yancheng District, Kaohsiung, Taiwan.

History
Kaohsiung Film Archive was established in 2001. The building of Kaohsiung Film Archive was originally used as the campus building of Yancheng Junior High School and public service station of Kuomintang. It was then transferred to Kaohsiung City Chinese Orchestra. Once the orchestra had moved to Kaohsiung City Music Hall, the building was left idle. After confirming the location at the building, Kaohsiung Mayor Frank Hsieh and his team searched for financial support and subsidy from the Executive Yuan and finally obtained subsidy from the Ministry of the Interior and Council for Cultural Affairs.

Architecture
Kaohsiung Film Archive was designed based on the concept of image design and it looks like a large screen projecting the busy city.

Activities
Kaohsiung Film Archive regularly organizes film-related activities all year round. It plays free diversified artistic films every day.

Transportation
The center is accessible within walking distance north east of Yanchengpu Station of Kaohsiung MRT.

See also
 List of tourist attractions in Taiwan

References

External links

 

2001 establishments in Taiwan
Arts organizations established in 2001
Buildings and structures in Kaohsiung
Cinemas in Taiwan